French submarine Naïade (Q15) was an early submarine built for the French Navy at the beginning of the 20th century.  She was of the Romazotti type, and the name ship of her class. Naiade remained in service until just prior to the outbreak of World War I.

Design and construction
Naïade was ordered by the French Navy under its 1900 building programme, the lead ship of a class of twenty. She was designed by Gaston Romazotti, an early French submarine engineer and director of the Cherbourg Naval Dockyard.  Naïade was built at Cherbourg, and launched on 20 February 1904. She was single-hulled, with dual propulsion, and constructed of Roma-bronze, a copper alloy of Romazotti's devising.
Naïade was named for the Naiads, the water spirits of Greek mythology, and was the latest of a line of French warships of that name.

Service history
Naïade entered service in early 1907, and was employed on coastal duties, guarding ports and harbours. She and her sisters were outdated by the next decade and she was stricken in May 1914.

Notes

References
 Gardiner R, Gray R: Conway’s All the World’s Fighting Ships 1906-1921 (1985) 
 

Naïade-class submarine
1904 ships
Ships built in France